Buckie Rovers Football Club were a Scottish football club from the town of Buckie, Moray. After a period abeyance during the 2021–22 season due to organisational difficulties caused by the Covid-19 pandemic in Scotland, the club folded in September 2022.

Rovers withdrew from the league early in season 2004–05 but rejoined the following year. The club used to share a ground with their larger Highland League neighbours Buckie Thistle but are now based at Merson Park in the Buckpool area of the town. The club colours are black and white.

Rovers earned promotion to the North Superleague for the first time after clinching the 2015–16 North Region Division One (West) championship in March 2016.

Honours
 North Region Division One (West) winners: 2015–16
 North Region (North) League winners: 1969–70, 1974–75, 1982–83, 1992–93
 Morayshire Junior League winners: 1962–63, 1964–65, 1965–66, 1967–68
 North Region Division Two (Gordon Williamson) Trophy: 1961–62, 1963–64, 1964–65, 1975–76, 1980–81
 Morayshire Junior Cup: 1946–47, 1966–67, 1967–68, 1981–82, 1996–97
 Matthew Cup: 1962–63, 1963–64, 1964–65, 1966–67, 1967–68, 1969–70, 1975–76, 1977–78, 1993–94, 1998–99
 Nicholson Cup: 1961–62, 1962–63, 1963–64, 1964–65, 1965–66, 1966–67, 1975–76, 1981–82, 1985–86
 Robertson Cup: 1962–63, 1965–66, 1983–84, 1995–96
 Stewart Memorial Cup: 1964–65, 1965–66, 1967–68, 1972–73, 1981–82
 North of Scotland (Morayshire) Cup: 1961–62, 1967–68, 1969–70, 1977–78
 Connon Cup: 1981–82
 White Horse Cup: 1947–48, 1961–62, 1966–67, 1969–70, 1975–76

References

Football in Moray
Football clubs in Scotland
Scottish Junior Football Association clubs
Association football clubs established in 1889
1889 establishments in Scotland
Buckie